Petřkovice may refer to:

 FC Odra Petřkovice -  a Czech football club located in the Petřkovice district of Ostrava
  – a municipal district of the city of Ostrava, Czech Republic
  – a part of the village of Starý Jičín, Czech Republic